Ballecer is a Filipino surname. Notable people with the surname include:

 Robert Ballecer (born 1974), American technology commentator
 Sud Ballecer, Filipino musician in Sud (band)

Surnames of Filipino origin